Inspiration Is Dead is the second full-length studio album by the Japanese rock band Ling tosite Sigure, released on August 22, 2007.

Track listing 
All tracks written by Toru "TK" Kitajima

References

External links 
 Ling tosite sigure discography 

2007 albums
Ling Tosite Sigure albums